The following list contains events that happened during 1800 in Australia.

Incumbents
Monarch - George III
Governor of New South Wales – Captain John Hunter (until 20 April), then Captain Philip King (from 28 September)

Events
26 April – William Balmain receives a land grant on the east side of Cockle Bay.
26 June – Major Joseph Foveaux is appointed Lieutenant-Governor of Norfolk Island.
16 July – Richard Johnson and Samuel Marsden open a church school in Kissing Point (Ryde).
7 September – Joseph Holt is arrested on suspicion of raising an Irish insurrection.
28 September – Captain Philip King sworn in as governor, as the previous governor Captain John Hunter returns to England.
29 September – William Paterson is appointed lieutenant governor of the colony.
19 November – The first copper coins are circulated in New South Wales. To prevent their removal from the colony they were issued at double their face value, that is a coin valued at one penny in England was deemed to represent twopence in New South Wales.
3 December – The brig Lady Nelson and Lt. James Grant arrive in Southern Australia; Grant names Cape Northumberland, Cape Banks, Mount Schanck and Mount Gambier.
7 December – Grant names Cape Otway; the Lady Nelson becomes the first ship to cross Bass Strait from the west.
 John Macarthur sends sample fleeces of merino wool to England from Australia to determine their quality.

Births
1 June – William Bradley, New South Wales politician
11 December – William Bowman, New South Wales politician

References

 
Years of the 18th century in Australia